The Loves of Your Life is a studio album by Hamilton Leithauser, the former frontman of the Walkmen. It was released on April 10, 2020, on Glassnote Records, and preceded by the singles "Here They Come", "Isabella", and "Don't Check the Score".

Track listing

References

Glassnote Records albums
2020 albums
Hamilton Leithauser albums